Picea purpurea, also known as purple cone spruce and purple-coned spruce is a species of spruce found only in China. It is likely to be a hybrid species produced by crosses between Picea likiangensis and Picea wilsonii, or possibly involving other species.

References

purpurea
Near threatened plants
Trees of China
Endemic flora of China
Plants described in 1906
Taxonomy articles created by Polbot